Presto Studios was a computer game development company of the 1990s. The company is notable for its award-winning series The Journeyman Project as well as  Myst III: Exile, the 2001 sequel to Cyan's Myst series.

In August 2002, Presto Studios shut down new development after the release of the Xbox title Whacked!. In a statement, Greg Uhler (executive producer) announced the closing of the company:

Due to business, financial, and personal reasons, Presto Studios is discontinuing software development. Whacked! for the Xbox will be the last product that we ship. The company will remain as a corporate entity for many years, but will not be developing products. A minimal staff, including Michel and myself, will be here until the end of October.

Closure of the company
Whacked! for Xbox was Presto Studios' final title before closing its doors shortly afterward. Though still in decent financial shape, Presto was facing an uphill challenge in the transition from the PC to console game market. The directors of the company anticipated a rapidly shrinking PC game market and decided to close the company while it was ahead. A significant number of the creative staff moved on to high-profile roles in motion picture and animation production.

Games
Hi-Rez Audio Volume 1 (1992, Macintosh)
The Journeyman Project (1993, Macintosh, Windows)
The Journeyman Project Turbo! (1994, Macintosh, Windows)
The Journeyman Project 2: Buried in Time (1995, Macintosh, Windows)
The Journeyman Project: Pegasus Prime (1997, Macintosh, Windows, Linux)
Gundam 0079: The War for Earth (1997, Macintosh, PlayStation, Windows)
The Journeyman Project 3: Legacy of Time (1998, Macintosh, Windows)
Beneath (cancelled, scheduled for 1999 release)
Star Trek: Hidden Evil (1999, Windows)
Stephen King's F13 (1999, Macintosh, Windows)
Myst: Masterpiece Edition (2000, Macintosh)
The Journeyman Project 4: Resurrection (cancelled, scheduled for 2000 release)
Myst III: Exile (2001, Macintosh, Windows, Xbox, PlayStation 2)
Whacked! (2002, Xbox)

Beneath
Beneath is a third-person action-adventure game developed by Presto Studios that was scheduled to be published by Activision in 1999, but was cancelled.

In 1906, Jack Wells travels to the Arctic in search of his father, who has gone missing on an archeological expedition. The exploration leads underground into a vast subterranean world.

The 3D game engine was to feature 16-bit graphics and hardware acceleration.

References

External links
Presto Studios Archives
Presto Studios at MobyGames
Tommy Yune on history of The Journeyman Project at Adventure Classic Gaming

Defunct video game companies of the United States
Video game companies established in 1991
Video game companies disestablished in 2002
Video game development companies
Companies based in San Diego County, California
1991 establishments in California
2002 disestablishments in California